The following buildings were added to the National Register of Historic Places as part of the Sebring MPS Multiple Property Submission (or MPS).

Notes

National Register of Historic Places Multiple Property Submissions in Florida